is the Japanese word for freshwater eel, particularly the Japanese eel, . Unagi is a common ingredient in Japanese cooking, often as kabayaki. It is not to be confused with saltwater eel, which is known as anago in Japanese.

In Japanese cuisine
Unagi is served as part of unadon (sometimes spelled unagidon, especially in menus in Japanese restaurants in Western countries), a donburi dish with sliced eel served on a bed of rice. A kind of sweet biscuit called unagi pie made with powdered unagi also exists.  Unagi is high in protein, vitamin A, and calcium.

Specialist unagi restaurants are common in Japan, and commonly have signs showing the word unagi with hiragana う (transliterated u), which is the first letter of the word unagi. Lake Hamana in Hamamatsu city, Shizuoka prefecture is considered to be the home of the highest quality unagi; as a result, the lake is surrounded by many small restaurants specializing in various unagi dishes. Unagi is often eaten during the hot summers in Japan. There is even a special day for eating unagi, the midsummer day of the Ox (doyo no ushi no hi).

Unakyu is a common expression used for sushi containing eel and cucumber. As eel is poisonous unless cooked, eels are always cooked, and in Japanese food, are often served with tare sauce.  Unagi that is roasted without tare and only seasoned with salt is known as "Shirayaki."

Sustainability
Seafood Watch, a sustainable seafood advisory list, recommends that consumers avoid eating unagi due to significant pressures on worldwide freshwater eel populations. All three eel species used as unagi have seen their population sizes greatly reduced in the past half century. For example, catches of the European eel have declined about 80% since the 1960s. The Japanese Ministry of the Environment has officially added Japanese eel to the “endangered” category of the country's Red List of animals ranging from “threatened” to “extinct”.

Although about 90% of freshwater eel consumed in the U.S. are farm-raised, they are not bred in captivity. Instead, young eels are collected from the wild and then raised in various enclosures. In addition to wild eel populations being reduced by this process, eels are often farmed in open net pens which allow parasites, waste products, and diseases to flow directly back into wild eel habitat, further threatening wild populations. Freshwater eels are carnivores and as such are fed other wild-caught fish, adding another element of unsustainability to current eel farming practices.

References

External links

Japanese cuisine terms
Japanese seafood